St. Adalbert's Church was a Roman Catholic church in western Königsberg, Germany. It is now used by the Russian Orthodox Church.

History

The Königsberg suburb of Amalienau began to grow rapidly at the start of the 20th century. Construction of a small Neo-Gothic chapel on Lawsker Allee began on 16 July 1902 according to plans by Friedrich Heitmann, with its dedication occurring on 14 November 1904. It was expanded in 1932, and Adalbert of Prague was named as patron saint. Heitmann was buried in the church cemetery in 1921.

Aside from its steeple, the church was not heavily damaged during the 1945 Battle of Königsberg. The Soviet administration in Kaliningrad dismantled an extension of the church and the remainder was used by a manufacturing company. In 1975–2018 it was acquired by the IZMIRAN institute in Kaliningrad, Russia.

Gallery

References

1904 establishments in Germany
1945 disestablishments in Germany
Churches in Kaliningrad
Former churches in Königsberg
Gothic Revival church buildings in Russia
Roman Catholic churches completed in 1904
20th-century churches in Russia
Cultural heritage monuments of regional significance in Kaliningrad Oblast